Weybourne is a village on the coast of North Norfolk, England. The area is popular for its local countryside and coastline, particularly for walking, wildlife and bird-watching.

The parish church of All Saints is listed Grade II*. The adjacent standing remains of the Augustinian priory are Grade I and the site is a Scheduled Monument.

Toponymy
The village's name origin is uncertain. The second element is 'stream'. The specific may be a pre-English river-name, or perhaps, 'weir/mill-dam stream', although there is no evidence for the age of the mill pond here. Other suggestions such as the Old English 'wearg', 'felon' and 'wagu', 'quagmire' are less likely.

Climate

Weybourne has an oceanic climate (Köppen: Cfb).

Early history
Weybourne is mentioned in the Domesday Book of 1086, where it is called Wabrume. The remains of the Augustinian Weybourne Priory, founded around 1200 AD by Sir Ralph de Meyngaren (Mainwearing), stand on the site of a simpler Anglo-Saxon church. By 1494 one prior and three canons lived there: one canon complained that the priory was so poor it was unable to pay him his 20 shillings of annual pocket money. At a visitation in 1514, there was only one prior and one canon and this situation remained until King Henry VIII ordered the dissolution of monasteries and priories.

Second World War

Defence
Weybourne has long been considered a possible site for invasion, one reason being the deep water offshore. "He who would all England win, should at Weybourne Hope begin." During the Second World War defences were constructed around Weybourne as a part of British anti-invasion preparations of the Second World War. The beaches were blocked by landmines and extensive scaffolding barriers; further inland there were pillboxes, barbed wire entanglements, a long anti-tank ditch and other defences.

Weybourne Camp

During the Second World War, Weybourne Camp was a highly secret site and was an Anti-Aircraft Artillery range. This, along with a complementary camp at Stiffkey, represented the main live-firing training ranges for Anti-Aircraft Command in the war. Here the Norfolk coastline became a controlled zone by the British forces. Weybourne Camp was a vital part of this zone.

Weybourne Camp was visited twice by Winston Churchill in 1941. These visits took place after the Dunkirk evacuation when British defences were on high alert. During his first visit, a demonstration of projectile firing was carried out, but the result was most unsatisfactory. The Prime Minister gave the commandant just seven days to improve the standard. On the second visit, each demonstration ended in failure until finally, a Queen Bee pilotless target aircraft was shot down and crashed close to the VIP enclosure. History has it that all the senior staff were replaced the following day.

A rumoured German spy at Weybourne Windmill

Weybourne Windmill is a fine example of a tower mill, built in 1850, that has been restored but not to working condition. During the Second World War, suspicions arose in the village about the couple who lived at the mill: there were rumours that the residents were spying for the Germans. The man living in the mill was a Mr Dodds and his wife apparently had a strong foreign accent, which locals described as "like German or Austrian".

One night two local policemen were walking down the lane from the old coastguard cottages towards the mill when they saw a light flashing from the top of the mill out towards sea. Apparently no action was taken – oddly, given the wartime conditions and the closeness to Weybourne Camp – but seemingly it bothered one of the policemen and he went back a couple of nights later and saw lights again. Some time later, Mrs Dodds left her bicycle unattended outside the tennis court. The bicycle fell over and a bag fell out of the basket. A local picked the bicycle up and then the bag. He took a look inside and found a radio transmitter. He told the police and a day or two later the authorities arrived and took the lady and her husband away.

Weybourne also had a watermill which was located on Beach Road.

Amenities

There is a shop, Weybourne Stores, and The Ship public house, which serves ales and hot food most lunchtimes and evenings. A few minutes walk from the village centre is the Maltings Hotel, which provides bar and restaurant meals as well as accommodation.

The Muckleburgh Collection at Weybourne Camp

A popular attraction is the Muckleburgh Collection: the largest privately owned collection of tanks, armoured cars and other military vehicles used in wars across the globe.

The North Norfolk Railway

Another local attraction is the North Norfolk Railway, which runs from Sheringham through Weybourne to Holt. Also known as the "Poppy Line", this well-preserved railway cuts through the countryside to the east of Weybourne and passes through the carefully preserved country station, which also houses a locomotive shed with a carriage maintenance and restoration centre. The railway offers a  round trip by steam train, or vintage diesel trains on some journeys, through an area of North Norfolk designated as being of outstanding natural beauty.

Weybourne railway station

The main station was built in 1900; other structures of the appropriate era, such as the signal box, waiting room and footbridge have been imported from other locations. On the closure of the line, British Rail lifted the track and rased the station, apart from the main station building. It was used as the location for the filming of the Dad's Army episode, "The Royal Train" and is frequently used by film-makers and artists. On the station, there is a small shop, buffet and picnic area. At weekends, there is a bookshop selling a wide range of old railway books and magazines, railway videos and CDs commemorating times past.

The coastline and smuggling
At Weybourne the coast has an unusually steep shingle beach which was regarded as vulnerable to the threat of the Spanish Armada in 1588. The village was also a well-used location for smuggling items such as over-proof gin and pressed bales of tobacco. The coast between Sheringham and Weybourne was popular for landing goods because ships could anchor closer to the shore than anywhere else in the area. There was also a convenient gap in the cliffs through which goods could be easily transported. Local folklore says that the miller would stop the windmill's sails in the form of a cross to warn the smugglers that the customs or coastguards were on to them; when the coast was clear he would set the sails going once more. On Weybourne beach there was so little cover for the waiting land party that the men were reputed to bury themselves neck-deep in the shingle until the smuggling vessel appeared on the horizon. This story perhaps stretches credulity, but the fact that it is also told of Suffolk locations adds at least a little weight. In the 1800s, William J. Bolding, the owner of Weybourne watermill and much of the inland areas at Weybourne, reputedly turned a blind eye to goods landed on the beaches bordering his property, and was rewarded with contraband left discreetly on his doorstep. In February 1837, a Lieutenant George Howes and his men from Weybourne intercepted a large gang of armed smugglers at nearby Kelling.

Volunteers manning the Rocket House saved the lives of many seafarers from the ships wrecked along the Weybourne coast. The crew of the coal ship Emily however were not so lucky when it was lost: they all lost their lives except the master who survived. In 1823 a brig from Naples, carrying a cargo of olive oil broke up, but six of her crew were saved. When the Norwegian barque Ida was wrecked carrying pit-props to Cardiff, all the crew was rescued using a rocket line. The crew and some villagers salvaged some of the pit-props and it is said that many of these timbers survive in barns and cottages around Weybourne. In January 1915 the bodies of six sailors from the SS George Royle were washed up on Weybourne beach; there is a tombstone in the churchyard to their memory.  The Rocket House still stands but is now a private residence.

Changes in government policy have led to the discontinuation of management of coastal erosion in North Norfolk.

Notable residents
 Sir John Major, KG, CH, Prime Minister of the United Kingdom from 1990 to 1997, owns a house in Weybourne.
 Benjamin Pulleyne, Vicar of Weybourne, 1845–1861, was also headmaster of Gresham's School.

See also
North Norfolk Railway
RAF Weybourne
Spring Beck
Weybourne Windmill

References

External links

Weybourne Village Online Guide

Weybourne Towermill
North Norfolk Railway
Weybourne Station Webcam
The Muckleburgh Collection

North Norfolk
Tourist attractions in Norfolk
Populated coastal places in Norfolk
Villages in Norfolk
Civil parishes in Norfolk
Beaches of Norfolk